Edson Silva may refer to:
Edson Silva (footballer, born 1983), Portuguese footballer
Edson (footballer, born 1987), Brazilian central defender; currently plays for FC Porto
Edson Ratinho (born 1986), or simply Edson Ratinho, Brazilian football player currently plays as right winger for Bunyodkor
Edson Silva (footballer, born 1986), Brazilian footballer, a central defender; currently plays for Red Star Belgrade
Edson (footballer, born 1977), Brazilian footballer (defender / midfielder) of Korona Kielce
Edson Silva (canoeist) (born 1982), Brazilian canoeist
Edson Silva (footballer, born 1992), Angolan footballer